Julius Katz (March 9, 1925, in New York, NY – 1999) was United States Assistant Secretary of State for Economic and Business Affairs, appointed by President Ford.  He served in that post from 1976 to 1979.

He served in the U.S. Army from 1943 to 1945.  He got his B.A. in 1949 from the George Washington University and did graduate work until 1950 when he was hired by the State Department.  Between 1950 and 1968 his positions included Economic Adviser in the Office of Eastern European Affairs, Director of International Trade, and Director of International Commodities. He was, from 1968 to 1974, Deputy Assistant Secretary of State for International Resources and Food Policy, and Senior Deputy Assistant Secretary of State from 1974 to 1976.

After leaving the State Department during the Carter administration he held several positions in the private sector.  In 1989 he was nominated by President George H. W. Bush to be Deputy United States Trade Representative. He held this position until 1993.

Katz married Charlotte Friedman and they had three children.

References

External links
 
 American Presidency Project
 adst
 Ford library doc on nomination as Assistant Secretary of State

Carter administration personnel
George H. W. Bush administration personnel
Nixon administration personnel
Ford administration personnel
American diplomats
George Washington University alumni
1925 births
1999 deaths
Politicians from New York City